Texas Capital Bank is a bank headquartered in Dallas, Texas. The bank has branches located in every major city in Texas.  Its parent bank holding company is Texas Capital Bancshares.  It also operates an online-only banking division, Bask Bank.

History
The bank was established on December 18, 1998 by a group of entrepreneurial bankers who were able to raise $80 million in start-up capital, the most for a new financial institution at that time. In 2003, the company completed an IPO.  The online-only subsidiary Bask Bank was launched in early 2020.

In 2020, an potential merger with Independent Bank Group of McKinney, Texas collapsed, causing the CEO to step down.  In late 2021, the new CEO adopted a strategy of moving away from loan-oriented growth in the commercial banking sector, towards becoming a full-service financial institution over the following five years, and launched a new investment bank division.

On September 6, 2022, it was announced that Texas Capital Bancshares would sell BankDirect Capital Finance, a premium financing company founded in 2005, to Truist Financial for $3.4 billion.  The sale was part of its strategic shift, allowing it to shed a non-core business while increasing its capital levels during the transition.

In March 2022, Texas Capital Bank was named by Newsweek Magazine as the most trustworthy bank in America, based on a survey of 50,000 U.S. residents.  In October 2022, it expanded its lease at 2000 McKinney Avenue in Uptown Dallas for its headquarters, and the building was renamed Texas Capital Center.  Texas Capital Bancshares received investments from several hedge funds in late 2022.

Services
The bank primarily serves clients and operates full-service locations in Austin, Dallas, Fort Worth, Houston, and San Antonio metropolitan areas of Texas.  It also has an executive office in New York.  As of March 2023, the company held $28.4 billion in assets and around 2,200 employees.

The bank offers many business deposit products and services, as well as other treasury management services and consumer deposit products. The company also provides commercial loans and financing for corporate purposes, and personal wealth management and trust services.  It also has an online-only banking division, Bask Bank, with perks focusing on frequent airline fliers.  It operates a nonprofit arm called Texas Capital Bank Foundation.

References

External links
 Official website

Companies listed on the Nasdaq
American companies established in 1998
Banks established in 1998
Banks based in Texas
Banks based in the Dallas–Fort Worth metroplex
Companies based in Texas
Companies based in Dallas
Financial services companies of the United States
2003 initial public offerings